Bidarray-Pont-Noblia or Bidarrai is a railway station in Bidarray, Nouvelle-Aquitaine, France. The station was opened in 1892 and is located on the Bayonne - Saint-Jean-Pied-de-Port railway line. The station is served by TER (local) services operated by the SNCF.

Train services
The following services currently call at  Bidarray-Pont-Noblia:
local service (TER Nouvelle-Aquitaine) Bayonne - Saint-Jean-Pied-de-Port

See also 

 List of SNCF stations in Nouvelle-Aquitaine

References

Railway stations in France opened in 1892
Railway stations in Pyrénées-Atlantiques